Epik is a right-wing American domain registrar and web hosting company known for providing services to alt-tech websites that host far-right, neo-Nazi, and other extremist materials. It has been described as a haven for the far-right because of its willingness to provide services to far-right websites that have been denied service by other Internet service providers.

Some of Epik's notable clients have included social network Gab and the imageboard website 8chan. In 2021, the Parler social network moved its domain registration to Epik when it was denied hosting and other web services after it was used to help plan the 2021 storming of the U.S. Capitol. Epik has also provided hosting and registrar services to Patriots.win, formerly TheDonald.win, an independent far-right forum that has served as the successor for the r/The_Donald subreddit that was banned in June 2020.

Epik was founded in 2009 by Rob Monster, and is based in Washington State. In September and October 2021, hackers identifying themselves as a part of Anonymous released several caches of data obtained from Epik in a large-scale data breach.

History
Epik was founded in 2009 by Rob Monster, who serves as the company's chief executive officer. Until 2018, Epik primarily focused on domain trading and mostly stayed out of the public spotlight. In 2018, the company came to public attention when they decided to provide services to Gab.

Epik is primarily known for its domain name registration services, and describes itself as the "Swiss bank of the domain industry". In the late 2010s, following a series of acquisitions, Epik also began providing an increasing variety of other web services including web hosting, content delivery network (CDN) services, and DDoS protection.

Acquisitions

In February 2019, it was announced that Epik had acquired BitMitigate, an American cybersecurity company based in Vancouver, Washington. BitMitigate protects websites against potential threats including distributed denial-of-service (DDoS) attacks. The company continues to operate as a division of Epik, and BitMitigate's founder Nicholas Lim briefly served as Epik's chief technology officer.

Epik acquired web hosting company Sibyl Systems Ltd. in the second quarter of 2019. Sibyl Systems was founded on October 22, 2018, and according to the Southern Poverty Law Center (SPLC) was possibly based in Norway or in England. Shortly after the company was founded, they began providing hosting services to Gab, which had just been terminated service by its previous web host due to the service's use by the perpetrator of the October 27, 2018 Pittsburgh synagogue shooting. Sibyl Systems was described in a February 2019 profile by the SPLC as a "shadowy operation with little transparency on its website, a murky history of ownership and no fixed base of operations".

Termination of services to Epik
When Epik began providing services to 8chan in August 2019, after the imageboard was taken offline by its host when it was discovered that the perpetrator of the 2019 El Paso shooting allegedly posted his manifesto on the site, several service providers stopped providing services to Epik. Later on the day Epik began servicing 8chan, Epik's primary hardware and connectivity provider, Voxility, terminated their relationship with the company, briefly taking 8chan and other Epik customers offline. That week, when Amazon was informed they were hosting a Gab subdomain, Amazon took down the site and began working with Epik to make sure they were not indirectly providing support to 8chan. However, Amazon continued to provide services to Epik. On August 9, cloud hosting provider Linode informed Epik they would be terminating services to the company.

In October 2020, financial services provider PayPal terminated service for Epik due to financial risk concerns relating to the company's alternative currency called "Masterbucks", which can be used to purchase services from Epik or can be exchanged for U.S. currency. Mashable alleged that PayPal's concerns were related to the potential for money laundering, and that PayPal terminated service because Epik allegedly had not taken the proper legal steps to offer an alternate currency after being made aware of the issue a month prior. Mashable also reported that the termination was partly due to concerns by PayPal that the site was encouraging tax evasion by advertising the "tax advantages" of using Masterbucks. Epik subsequently published what Mashable described as "a series of unhinged open letters" targeting "PayPal, Hunter Biden, Bloomberg News, and several Avengers" and accusing PayPal of terminating service because they were biased against conservatives.

Data breach 

In September and October 2021, hackers identifying themselves as a part of the Anonymous hacktivist group published a large amount of data obtained from Epik in a series of three releases. On September 13, 2021, the group published a press release announcing they had obtained access to data including domain purchase and transfer details, account credentials and logins, payment history, employee emails, and unidentified private keys. The hackers claimed they had obtained "a decade's worth of data", including all customer data and records for all domains ever hosted or registered through the company, and which included poorly encrypted passwords and other sensitive data stored in plaintext. The Distributed Denial of Secrets (DDoSecrets) organization announced later that day that they were working to curate the leaked data for public download, and said that it consisted of "180gigabytes of user, registration, forwarding and other information". Journalists and security researchers subsequently confirmed the veracity of the hack and the types of data that had been exposed. An engineer performing an impact assessment for an Epik client told The Daily Dot that "They are fully compromised end-to-end... Maybe the worst I’ve ever seen in my 20-year career". The data was later confirmed to include approximately 15million unique email addresses, which belonged both to customers and non-customers whose data had been scraped from WHOIS records. Anonymous released additional data on September 29 and on October 4. The second release contained 300gigabytes of bootable disk images and API keys for third-party services used by Epik; the third contained additional disk images and data belonging to the Republican Party of Texas, an Epik customer.

On September 13, the day the breach was announced and the first portion of data was released, Epik said in statements to news outlets that they were "not aware of any breach". When the company did not acknowledge the breach, the attackers vandalized Epik's support website. On September 15, the company sent an email to customers notifying them of "an alleged security incident". Epik CEO Rob Monster confirmed the hack in a September 16 public video conference, which The Daily Dot described as "chaotic and bizarre" and which Le Monde characterized as "possibly one of the strangest responses to a computer security incident in history". The company publicly confirmed the breach on September 17, and began emailing customers to inform them on September 19.

Company 
Epik was founded in 2009 by Rob Monster, who serves as the company's chief executive officer. The company is based in Sammamish, Washington. , Epik is the 21st largest domain registrar in the United States and 48th largest globally, as measured by the number of domains registered through the company.

Epik board members have included Braden Pollock and Tal Moore. Joseph Peterson was Epik's director of operations from 2017 until 2019. Rob Davis serves as senior vice president for strategy and communications. Moore left the board in December 2018, over the company's choice to host Gab. Peterson left the company in 2019, and said that he left shortly after Monster began a company staff meeting by asking employees to watch the video of the Christchurch mosque shootings, which he said would prove to them that the attack had been faked. Pollock resigned in June 2020, and said that his departure was because he and Monster "don't share the same ideology" and because he disagreed with the company's direction.

Hosting of far-right and illicit content 
Epik is known for providing services to websites with far-right content, such as the social network Gab, video hosting service BitChute, and conspiracy theory website InfoWars.  It was described in 2019 by Vice as "a safehaven for the extreme right" and in 2021 by The Seattle Times as "a home for far-right websites" because of its willingness to host far-right websites that have been denied service by other Internet service providers. In 2021, The Daily Telegraph wrote that Epik was "a safe harbour for websites said to be enabling the spread far-right extremism and carrying Neo-Nazi content"; the same year, Fortune called the company the "right wing's best friend online". NPR reported in February 2021 that "when websites flooded with hate speech or harmful disinformation become too radioactive for the Internet, the sites often turn to [Epik] for a lifeline."

Epik has provided services for websites, platforms, and groups including Parler, 8chan, Gab, BitChute, Patriots.win, The Daily Stormer, InfoWars, One America News Network, AR15.com, Kiwi Farms, the Proud Boys, and the Oath Keepers. Bobby Allyn writing for NPR has described the websites Epik services: "Spend a few minutes on these sites, conspiracy theories about the 2020 presidential election, vaccines and mass shootings are not hard to find, not to mention a steady stream of bigoted content about Jews, women and people of color."

Epik describes itself as a protector of free speech, and its CEO Rob Monster has defended its decisions to host extremist content as being a part of Epik's commitment to "welcome all views, without bias or preference". Monster has said he is repudiating "cancel culture" and Big Tech. In May 2019, the Counter Extremism Project's Joshua Fisher-Birch criticized Epik for this stance, saying that, "while Epik portrays this as a noble exercise in anti-censorship, they're making a business decision to continue to amplify voices calling for violence." In February 2021, Michael Edison Hayden of the SPLC said that although hate speech can be found throughout the internet, including on mainstream social networks like Facebook and Twitter, "The difference is there are people with terroristic ambitions plotting out in the open, producing propaganda that they seek to use to kind of encourage violence. And those are the kind of websites Rob Monster is willing to pick up."

Parler 

In January 2021, the alt-tech social network Parler transferred its domain name registration to Epik, following the termination of its hosting and support services by other providers on account of it being "overrun" with death threats and celebrations of violence. According to Fortune, Epik provided Parler with advice on running the service, including to add more moderators, improve systems to detect harmful posts, and change their terms of service.

8chan

On August 5, 2019, Epik competitor Cloudflare announced that in the wake of the 2019 El Paso shooting they would no longer be providing services to 8chan, a far-right imageboard known as a location for hateful content and child pornography, which the perpetrator of the shooting had allegedly used immediately prior to the attack to post a manifesto justifying his actions. The same day that 8chan was removed from Cloudflare, Epik began providing hosting services, and Monster released a statement explaining their decision. Later that day, Epik's primary hardware and connectivity provider Voxility banned Epik from renting their server space. Voxility's vice president of business development stated, "We have made the connection that at least two or three of the latest mass shootings in the U.S. were connected with [Epik and BitMitigate]. At some point, somebody needed to make the decision on where the limit is between what is illegal and what is freedom of speech and today it had to be us." The Voxility ban took 8chan offline, along with The Daily Stormer and other Epik customers. On August 6, Epik reversed course and announced that they would not provide hosting services to 8chan; on August 7, Ars Technica noted that Epik had only ceased hosting their content and was still providing 8chan with DNS services.

Gab

Epik received media attention in early November 2018 for registering Gab, an American alt-tech social networking service known for its far-right userbase, after it was ousted by GoDaddy for allowing "content on the site that both promotes and encourages violence against people". This came shortly after it was revealed that the perpetrator of the Pittsburgh synagogue shooting had used the service to post "hateful content". Tal Moore, a member of Epik's board, resigned in December 2018 over the company's involvement with Gab. On November 7, 2018, Pennsylvania Attorney General Josh Shapiro sent a subpoena to Epik requesting "any and all documents which are related in any way to Gab" after Gab registered its domains onto Epik. Gab posted screenshots of the subpoena letter in a tweet on the day the subpoena was sent, despite being asked to keep the letter confidential. The tweet was deleted hours later. In an email statement to Ars Technica, Monster stated that "the news of the subpoena was not intended for public consumption" and that "we are cooperating with their inquiry".

Patriots.win 

Epik provides hosting to Patriots.win, previously known as TheDonald.win, the independent far-right web forum that was created as a successor to the r/The_Donald subreddit banned by Reddit in June 2020. The website has been labeled "a magnet for extreme discourse" by the Financial Times. It has been likened to other clients of Epik's, Gab and 8chan, as those sites were also created to bypass hate speech policies on more mainstream sites.

According to a January 16, 2021 report from the Wall Street Journal, Epik had threatened to take TheDonald.win offline over the forum failing to remove white supremacist, racist, and violent content. The Journal also reported that Jody Williams, TheDonald.win's owner, had received multiple requests from the FBI for user information due to threatening posts. Williams had struggled to moderate the forum's racist, antisemitic, and violent posts over the prior months, and some of TheDonald.win's volunteer moderators had responded by thwarting Williams's efforts to take down the violent and objectionable content on the forum. Williams and his family had also received daily death threats from the users he banned from the forum. On January 20, 2021, due to an internal power struggle over the TheDonald.win domain between the moderators and Williams, a new forum called Patriots.win was created and TheDonald.win was shut down by Williams on January 21. , Epik was providing services to Patriots.win.

The Daily Stormer 

In August 2017, BitMitigate, an American cybersecurity company began hosting American neo-Nazi, white supremacist, and Holocaust denial commentary and message board website The Daily Stormer. This was in response to GoDaddy and Cloudflare terminating services for the site after it published an article mocking Heather Heyer, the victim of the vehicle ramming attack that occurred at the Unite the Right rally in Charlottesville, Virginia that same month. When Epik acquired BitMitigate in 2019, it was still hosting the website. Monster has said that when Epik discovered it was providing services to the website, it stopped doing so. In a 2021 interview with NPR, Monster said that Epik's connection to The Daily Stormer was "regrettable", and that "The greatest cost of acquiring BitMitigate was not the amount of cash that we paid to buy the technology, but the entanglement."

BitChute 

Epik is the domain registrar for the video sharing platform BitChute, which is known for accommodating far-right individuals and conspiracy theorists, and for hosting hateful content.

Lack of response to reports of illegal activity
Wired wrote in 2018 that Epik has a history of not responding to reports of illegal activity on the websites they register, which the magazine noted is unusual for domain registrars based in the United States. Pharmaceutical watchdog website LegitScript reported in 2018 that they had alerted Epik to the sale of illegal drugs and counterfeit medications on websites registered by Epik, and that Epik had refused to act upon the information without a court order.

See also 

 DDoS-Guard

References

External links

Alt-tech
American companies established in 2009
Companies based in King County, Washington
Domain name registrars
Internet technology companies of the United States
Neo-Nazism in the United States
Web hosting
Sammamish, Washington
Technology companies established in 2009